A list of missiles used by Pakistan.

Surface-to-surface missiles

Rocket Artillery 
 KRL Ghazab — (40 km)
 A-100E — (120 km) — (China)
 Fateh-1 — (150 km)

Anti-tank Guided Missiles (ATGM) 
BGM-71 TOW — (3.75 km) — (USA)
 GIDS Baktar-Shikan — (4 km)
 Kornet-E — (8 km) — (Russia)

Battlefield Range or Tactical Ballistic Missiles (BRBM) 
 KRL Hatf-I — (70 km)
 KRL Hatf-IA — (100 km)
 KRL Hatf-IB — (100 km)
 Nasr — (70-100+ km)
Ghaznavi — (290-320 km)

Short Range Ballistic Missiles (SRBM) 
M-11 — (350 km) — (China)
 Abdali — (280-450 km)
 Shaheen — (750 km)
 Shaheen-I — (900 km)
 Shaheen-IA — (1000 km)

Medium Range Ballistic Missiles (MRBM) 
 KRL Ghauri-I — (1,500 km)
 KRL Ghauri-II — (2,000-2,300 km)
 Ababeel — (2,200 km)
 Shaheen-II — (2,500 km)
 Shaheen-III — (2,750 km)

Ground-Launched Anti-Ship & Anti-Surface Guided Missiles 

 Babur 1 (Hatf VII) — (Cruise Missile) 
Babur-1A (Hatf VII) — (Cruise Missile) 
Babur-1B (Hatf VII) — (Cruise Missile)
 Babur 2 (Hatf VII) — (Cruise Missile) 
 Zarb (C-602) — (Cruise Missile) — (China)

Ship-Launched Anti-Ship & Anti-Surface Guided Missiles 

Harbah — (Cruise Missile) 
Zarb (C-602) — (Cruise Missile) — (Ship-launched variant) — (China) 
C-802A — (Cruise Missile) — (China)  
CM-302 — (Cruise Missile) — (China)
Harpoon block-2 — (Active Radar Homing Guided Missile) — (USA)
Exocet SM-39 — (GPS/INS Guided Missile) — (France)

Submarine-Launched Anti-Ship & Anti-Surface Guided Missiles 

 Babur 3 (Hatf VII) — (Cruise Missile) — (Submarine-launched variant)

Air-to-surface missiles

Baktar-Shikan — (Air-launched variant)
Barq — (Laser-Guided Missile) — (Fired by Burraq UCAV) 
Ra'ad (Hatf VIII) — (Cruise Missile)  
Ra'ad-II — (Cruise Missile)
H-2 SOW / H-4 SOW — (Precision-Guided Glide Munitions)
GIDS Takbir - (Precision-Guided Glide Bomb)
MAR-1 — (Anti-Radiation Missile) — (Brazil)
CM-400AKG — (Anti-Radiation Missile) — (China)
LD-10 — (Anti-Radiation Missile) — (China)
LS-6 — (Precision-Guided Glide Bombs) — (China)
C-705KD — (Imaging Infrared Homing Guided Missile) — (China)
C-802AK — (Air-launched variant) — (Cruise Missile) — (China) 
AGM-65 Maverick — (Electro-Optical Guided Missile) — (USA)
Harpoon Block-2 — (Air-launched variant) — (Active Radar Homing Guided Missile) — (USA)
Exocet AM-39 — (Air-launched variant) — (GPS/INS Guided Missile) — (France)
 AGM-114R Hellfire II — (Laser-Guided Missile) — (USA) — (Ordered for Bell AH-1Z Viper Attack Helicopter but delivery on hold.)

Surface-to-air missiles

HQ-2B — (Air Force) — (China)
Spada-2000 — (Air Force) — (Italy)
Crotale — (Air Force) — (France)
HQ-9P — (Army) — (China)
HQ-16AE — (Army) — (China)
HQ-7B — (Army and Navy) — (China)
LY-60N — (Navy) — (China)
Seacat — (Navy) — (UK)
CAMM-ER — (Ordered by Navy) — (Italy)
RIM-116 (SeaRAM) — (Ordered by Navy) — (USA)
SIMBAD-RC — (Ordered by Navy) — (France)

Shoulder-Fired Missiles 

 GIDS Anza — (Mk.1, Mk.2, Mk.3)
RBS 70 — (1711 missiles, 913 Mk 1, 85 Mk 2 and 713 Bolide Mk 2) — Used in MANPADS configuration, vehicle application includes RBS 70 VLM mounted on M113A2 APCs.) — (Sweden)
FIM-92 Stinger — (400 MANPADS) — (USA)
FN-16 — (300 MANPADS) — (China)

Air-to-air missiles 

 Magic R.550 — (France)
 R-Darter — (South Africa)
 PL-5E — (China)
 PL-9 — (China)
 PL-10 (ASR) — (China)
 PL-12 (SD-10A) — (China)
 PL-15 — (China)
 AIM-9 — (USA)
 AIM-120C — (USA)

See also 
 Pakistani missile research and development program
 List of missiles
 List of missiles by country

References

External links

 
Pakistan military-related lists